The Cottage Plantation is a historic Southern plantation in St. Francisville, Louisiana, USA. The house was built from 1795 to 1859. It has been listed on the National Register of Historic Places since March 17, 1975.

References

Houses on the National Register of Historic Places in Louisiana
Houses in West Feliciana Parish, Louisiana
Houses completed in 1859
Plantations in Louisiana
National Register of Historic Places in West Feliciana Parish, Louisiana